The Financial Access Initiative (FAI) is an American consortium, established in 2006, of researchers at New York University (NYU), Yale University, Harvard University and Innovations for Poverty Action (IPA) focused on finding answers to how financial sectors can better meet the needs of poor households.

The Initiative was launched with core funding from the Bill and Melinda Gates Foundation to the Robert F. Wagner Graduate School of Public Service at NYU.
Led by Managing Director Jonathan Morduch (NYU), Dean Karlan (Yale), Sendhil Mullainathan (Harvard), the Initiative seeks to provide rigorous research on the impacts of financial access and on innovative ways to improve access. FAI’s website states that financial access holds the promise to help low-income individuals in developing countries manage their economic lives and build wealth.

Activities
The Financial Access Initiative involves three main activities:   
 Systematizing evidence and communicating lessons:  Clarify and organize what is known (and what needs to be known) about the demand for finance by the poor.  Emphasis is placed on presenting the information in actionable form and targeting regulators, donors, and other key decision makers.
 Generating new evidence:  Key topics include the nature of demand for financial services; the extent of impacts of financial access on incomes, businesses, and broader aspects of well being; and mechanisms that can increase impact and scale.
 Policy around regulation:  Describe policy options for central bankers and regulators in a high-level but accessible format. The outputs are independent guides to policy with an emphasis on direct effects and trade-offs of policy choices.

Research
Funded by a $5 million grant from the Bill & Melinda Gates Foundation, FAI’s research aims to assess existing research on global financial access, generate new evidence through field work, and inform regulatory policy.

Field research
Field research is coordinated by Innovations for Poverty Action, an organization based in New Haven, Connecticut, and headed by Dean Karlan.  Current research is taking place in Bolivia, Indonesia, South Africa, Mexico, Peru, India, Ghana, and the Philippines. Randomized control trials are used to focus on three central research initiatives: demand for financial services, impact of financial services and the role of regulatory policy.

Supporters
The Bill and Melinda Gates Foundation

Partner websites
Innovations for Poverty Action

References

External links
 Official website Financial Access Initiative
 “In Praise of Usury” The Economist
 “The Poor’s Access to Microcredit” The Morningside Post

Microfinance organizations
Organizations established in 2006
Development economics
Non-profit organizations based in New York (state)
Harvard University
New York University